Ernest Jeffrey Moniz, GCIH (born December 22, 1944) is an American nuclear physicist and former government official. From May 2013 to January 2017, he served as the 13th United States secretary of Energy in the Obama Administration. Prior to this, Moniz served as associate director for science in the Office of Science and Technology Policy in the Executive Office of the President of the United States from 1995 to 1997 and undersecretary of energy from 1997 to 2001 during the Clinton Administration. He is currently the co-chair and CEO of the Nuclear Threat Initiative (NTI), as well as president and CEO of the Energy Futures Initiative (EFI), a nonprofit organization working on climate and energy technology issues, which he co-founded in 2017.

Moniz, who is one of the founding members of The Cyprus Institute, has served at Massachusetts Institute of Technology (MIT) as the Cecil and Ida Green professor of physics and engineering systems, director of the Energy Initiative and director of the Laboratory for Energy and the Environment. Before his appointment as secretary of energy, he served in a variety of advisory capacities, including at BP, General Electric and the King Abdullah Petroleum Studies and Research Center in Riyadh, Saudi Arabia.

Early life and education
Moniz was born in 1944 in Fall River, Massachusetts, the son of Georgina (Pavão) Moniz and Ernest Perry Moniz, both of whom were Portuguese immigrants from São Miguel Island, Azores. He graduated from Durfee High School in Fall River in 1962, where he was a member of the National Honor Society and was the president of the school's math club. After graduating from high school, Moniz attended Boston College, where he received his Bachelor of Science  in physics. In 1972, he received his Master of Science and Ph.D. degrees in theoretical physics from Stanford University.

Career
After graduating from Stanford, Moniz joined the faculty of the Massachusetts Institute of Technology (MIT) in 1973, serving as head of the department of physics from 1991 to 1995 and as director of the Bates Linear Accelerator Center. He co-chairs the MIT research council. He served in the Clinton administration as associate director for science in the Office of Science and Technology Policy in the Executive Office of the President from 1995 to 1997.

Moniz worked in the United States Department of Energy, serving as undersecretary of energy from 1997 to 2001. Moniz was one of the founding members of The Cyprus Institute in 2005, where he and other scholars undertook the coordination, research and planning of the project. In 2013, he received the honorary degree Doctor Honoris Causa from the Universidad Pontificia Comillas de Madrid in recognition of his research on energy policies and technologies.

U.S. Secretary of Energy (2013–2017)

On May 16, 2013, his appointment was confirmed on a 97–0 vote by the Senate. He succeeded Steven Chu as secretary of energy.  Moniz was sworn in as energy secretary on May 21, 2013 by deputy energy secretary Daniel Poneman.

Moniz played a crucial role in negotiations toward a comprehensive agreement on the Iranian nuclear program, directly negotiating technical details with the Iranian atomic energy minister Ali Akbar Salehi, an MIT graduate, and reassuring President Obama that concessions important to the Iranians would not pose a major threat. The comprehensive agreement between Iran and the so-called "P5+1" (which includes the 5 permanent members of the UN Security Council, plus Germany and a representative from the European Union) was finalized on July 14, 2015, to much fanfare and criticism.

Some environmental advocacy groups opposed Moniz' nomination due to his support for nuclear power and fracking as a "bridge fuel" to ease the transition away from coal energy. Others opposed him because he had previously served on the board of a number of energy companies like BP and ICF, although Obama noted that he had nominated Moniz in part specifically because of his track record of working with industry.

Career after office 
In June 2017, Moniz became co-chairman and chief executive officer of the Nuclear Threat Initiative, a nonpartisan, nonprofit organization working to prevent catastrophic attacks with weapons of mass destruction and disruption—nuclear, biological, radiological and cyber. He also founded a nonprofit organization called the Energy Futures Initiative, where he has promoted the concept of a "Green Real Deal" as a "practical, science-based" solution to climate change. The concept attracted praise in the media from The New York Times columnist Thomas Friedman and criticism from Greenpeace USA.

In 2018, Moniz was hired by the government of Saudi Arabia to serve as member of the global advisory board of the Neom project, a $500 billion planned megacity in the Tabuk Region.

In November 2020, Moniz was named a candidate for energy secretary in the Biden Administration. However, former governor of Michigan Jennifer Granholm was chosen instead.

Honors
 Grand Cross of the Order of Makarios III, Cyprus
 Grand Cross of the Order of Prince Henry, Portugal, 2015
 Grand Cordon of the Order of the Rising Sun, Japan, 2017
Fellow, American Academy of Arts and Sciences
Fellow, American Physical Society
Member, American Philosophical Society, 2020

References

External links

 Nuclear Threat Initiative 
Moniz Nomination: Hearing before the Committee on Energy and Natural Resources, United States Senate, One Hundred Thirteenth Congress, First Session, to Consider the Nomination of Dr. Ernest Moniz to be the Secretary of Energy, April 9, 2013
Dr. Ernest Moniz at the United States Department of Energy

"Why We Still Need Nuclear Power", Making Clean Energy Safe and Affordable by Ernest Moniz in November/December 2011 Foreign Affairs

1944 births
21st-century American politicians
American nuclear physicists
American people of Portuguese descent
American people of Azorean descent
Morrissey College of Arts & Sciences alumni
Clinton administration personnel
Living people
Massachusetts Democrats
MIT Center for Theoretical Physics faculty
Obama administration cabinet members
Office of Science and Technology Policy officials
Politicians from Fall River, Massachusetts
Recipients of the Order of Prince Henry
Stanford University alumni
United States Secretaries of Energy
Members of the American Philosophical Society
Fellows of the American Physical Society
Fellows of the American Academy of Arts and Sciences
B.M.C. Durfee High School alumni